Leon Isaac Kennedy (born June 1, 1948 or January 1, 1949) (sources differ) is an American actor, disc jockey, film producer and playwright. Kennedy's acting roles include Martel "Too Sweet" Gordone in Jamaa Fanaka's Penitentiary (1979), Penitentiary II (1982), Lone Wolf McQuade (1983) and Penitentiary III (1987), and Leon "The Lover" Johnson in the 1981 film Body and Soul alongside his then-wife Jayne Kennedy.

Career
Born in Cleveland, Kennedy first began his career as a disc jockey and nightclub promoter. Kennedy headed to Los Angeles, California to seek success in his career in June 1971. Once in California, Kennedy became a DJ on the FM rock station and also worked as a coordinator for a variety show.<ref>Jet, May 24, 1973 - Page 21 - 23 LIFESTYLES, Beauty + Brains = Success</ref> In 1972, Kennedy had a part in Fred Williamson's action film Hammer. In 1976, Kennedy appeared in another Fred Williamson film, Mean Johnny Barrows. Kennedy later appeared in the 1978 film Death Force with his then-wife Jayne Kennedy and with James Iglehart.

In 1981, Body and Soul was released. The film featured Kennedy in the lead role as Leon Johnson, an up-and-coming boxer, and was written by him as well. A remake of 1947's Body and Soul, the film also starred Jayne Kennedy and Peter Lawford. In 1988, Kennedy appeared with Ernest Borgnine, Herbert Lom, Oliver Reed, Robert Vaughn and Arnold Vosloo in Skeleton Coast. In 1991, Kennedy appeared in Damages which was an episode of Against the Law'' playing the part of Spider.

Personal life
Kennedy has been married three times. In June 1971, Kennedy, then 22, married Jayne Harrison, a 19–year old beauty pageant contestant who was from Wickliffe, Ohio; they divorced in 1982. In 1995, Kennedy married Lolita Armbrister. In August 2005, Kennedy married actress Maureen LaVette. Kennedy became a Christian evangelist during the early 1990s. In 2014, Kennedy sued Ebony magazine and Johnson Publishing Company, claiming in an article for their March 2013 "Scandal" issue the magazine falsely identified him as the person who leaked the infamous 1970s sextape of him with his then–wife Jayne Kennedy during their 1981 divorce proceedings.

References

External links

 Official website
 

1948 births
1949 births
Living people
African-American male actors
American male actors
21st-century African-American people
20th-century African-American people